Rail transport in Belarus is owned by the national rail company BŽD / BČ (be: Bielaruskaja Čyhunka / ru: Belorusskaja Železnaja Doroga).

History

The first line crossing the country was the Saint Petersburg–Warsaw Railway, which started operating in late 1862. This included section and railway station in Hrodna. During the mid-1860s, railway line was built also from Daugavpils to Polatsk and further to Vitebsk. Line Warsaw-Brest, opened in 1866, completed to Moscow in 1871.

Network

Belarus is crossed, from Brest to Orsha through Minsk, by an international rail line connecting Berlin and Warsaw to Moscow. Other important lines are the Minsk-Gomel (to Kyiv), the Orsha-Vitebsk (to Saint Petersburg), the Minsk-Vilnius and others. Some international trains serving Belarus are the Pribaltika Riga-Odessa, the Minsk-Irkutsk and the Sibirjak Berlin-Novosibirsk (and other Russian destinations).

The national network has no high-speed lines and is not served by high-speed trains.

Urban railways

Minsk is the only city with a subway system, the Minsk Metro. The network consists of three lines: Awtazavodskaya, Maskoŭskaja and Zelenaluzhskaya.
The only cities with tramway systems are Minsk, Vitebsk, Mazyr and Novopolotsk.

Rail links to adjacent countries
(Poland) – yes – break-of-gauge /
(Lithuania) – yes
(Latvia) – yes
(Russia) – yes
(Ukraine) – yes (closed)

See also
Transport in Belarus
List of town tramway systems in Belarus
Children's Railroad of Minsk
Rail transport in the Soviet Union

References

External links

 BŽD official website
Railway network map of Belarus

 
Belarus